Scopula tenuimedia is a moth of the  family Geometridae. It is found in India (the Khasia Hills).

References

Moths described in 1938
tenuimedia
Moths of Asia